Pablo Íñiguez de Heredia Larraz (born 20 January 1994), known as Íñiguez, is a Spanish professional footballer who plays for Villarreal CF B mainly as a central defender but also as a defensive midfielder.

Club career
Born in Burgos, Íñiguez joined Villarreal CF's academy in 2003, aged only nine. He was selected by the first team for a La Liga match against Real Betis on 19 November 2011, but did not leave the bench; he met the same fate against FC Bayern Munich in the UEFA Champions League.

On 14 January 2012, one week before his 18th birthday, Íñiguez made his professional debut, appearing for the reserves against FC Cartagena in the Segunda División. He played his first competitive game with the main squad on 2 December, starting in a 1–0 away loss to Elche CF in the same league.

Iñiguez signed a new five-year contract with the Yellow Submarine, recently promoted to the top flight, on 27 August 2013. His debut in the competition was made on 19 August, when he featured the entire 3–2 away win over UD Almería. On 21 August of the following year, he moved to second division club Girona FC in a season-long loan.

On 5 July 2016, Íñiguez was loaned to Rayo Vallecano for one season. On 11 July of the following year, he joined fellow second-tier side CF Reus Deportiu permanently, with Villarreal holding a buy-back clause.

Íñiguez agreed to a two-year deal at Hércules CF on 10 July 2019, after a loan spell.

International career
Íñiguez represented Spain at under-17, under-19, under-20 and under-21 levels. He won his only cap for the latter on 12 November 2014, when he played 85 minutes in the 1–4 friendly loss to Belgium in Ferrol.

Personal life
Íñiguez's father, Roberto, was a basketball player who competed in the Liga ACB. He later became a manager.

References

External links
Villarreal official profile 

1994 births
Living people
Spanish people of Basque descent
Sportspeople from Burgos
Spanish footballers
Footballers from Castile and León
Association football defenders
Association football midfielders
Association football utility players
La Liga players
Segunda División players
Segunda División B players
Tercera División players
Primera Federación players
Villarreal CF C players
Villarreal CF B players
Villarreal CF players
Girona FC players
Rayo Vallecano players
CF Reus Deportiu players
Hércules CF players
Atlético Levante UD players
Spain youth international footballers
Spain under-21 international footballers